Route 149 is a state highway in east-central Connecticut running from Route 82 in East Haddam center to the Colchester-Hebron town line.

Route description
Route 149 begins as Main Street at an intersection with Route 82 in town center of East Haddam and heads north along the Connecticut River, then northeast as East Haddam-Moodus Road along the Moodus River. It overlaps briefly with Route 151 in the village of Moodus before continuing northeast through the village of bashan towards the town of Colchester. North of Moodus, the road is known as Falls Road and Sipples Hill Road. On entering Colchester, it continues north and northeast, as Westchester Road intersecting with Route 16 in the village of Westchester. After crossing the Jeremy River, it enters the village of North Westchester, where it has an interchange with Route 2 (at Exit 16) and then terminates  later at an intersection with Old Hartford Road (an old alignment of Route 2) at the town line with Hebron.

The section of Route 149 from the southern terminus to milepost 2.31 in East Haddam is designated as a scenic road. This portion of the road runs through the East Haddam Historic District along the banks of the Connecticut River and Moodus River.

History
In the 1920s, the East Haddam-Moodus-Westchester route was designated as a state highway known as Highway 148. In the 1932 state highway renumbering, old Highway 148 was renumbered to Route 149.

Junction list

References

External links

149
Transportation in Middlesex County, Connecticut
Transportation in New London County, Connecticut
Transportation in Tolland County, Connecticut